The Epson Tour, previously known as the LPGA Futures Tour, and known for sponsorship reasons between 2006 and 2010 as the Duramed Futures Tour and between 2012 and 2021 as the Symetra Tour, is the official developmental golf tour of the LPGA Tour. Tour membership is open to professional women golfers and to qualified amateurs.

History
The Futures Tour was founded in Florida in 1981 as the "Tampa Bay Mini Tour". It officially became the Futures Golf Tour in 1983 and in 1999 become a national tour designated as the "official developmental tour" of  the LPGA Tour (the U.S.-based professional women's golf tour).

Grace Park, Marilyn Lovander and Audra Burks were the first players to receive automatic LPGA Tour exempt status by finishing one, two, and three on the Futures Golf Tour Money List.

The minimum age for participation was lowered to 17 prior to the 2006 season. On July 18, 2007, the LPGA announced that it had acquired the Futures Tour effective immediately, "bringing women's professional golf now under one umbrella."  Previously the Futures Tour had operated as a licensee of the LPGA.

Duramed, a pharmaceutical company, was the tour's title sponsor from 2006 through the end of the 2010 season. In 2011, the tour was known as the "LPGA Futures Tour." In 2012, Symetra, a United States-based insurance provider, became the title sponsor of the tour and tour's name was changed to "Symetra Tour". In 2022, the LPGA signed a five-year title sponsorship agreement with Epson America Inc.

Promotion to LPGA

1999–2007
From 1999 through 2007 the top five leading money winners at the end of each season earned full membership in the following season's LPGA Tour.  Starting with the sixth-ranked player at the end of the season, ten additional Futures Tour players who are not already members of the LPGA, automatically advanced into the LPGA Final Qualifying Tournament, bypassing the sectional qualifying tournament.

2008–2010
Beginning in 2008 the process for promotion to the LPGA Tour was changed. The top ten leading money winners at the end of the season gain membership on the LPGA Tour for the next season, with those finishing in the top five positions gaining higher priority for entry into events than those finishing in positions six through ten. Finishers in positions sixth through ten still have the option to attend LPGA Qualifying School to try to improve their membership for the following season.

2011–present
Beginning in 2011, the promotion process was changed slightly to allow the next 12 players, excluding current LPGA members, after the top ten qualifiers to automatic entry into Stage III of the LPGA Qualifying Tournament.

The tour also offers instant promotion to the LPGA for those who win three times in a single season, similar to the PGA-affiliated Korn Ferry Tour and European Tour-affiliated Challenge Tour.

Players
Futures Tour graduates include LPGA tournament winners Laura Davies, Meaghan Francella, Cristie Kerr, Christina Kim, Mo Martin, Lorena Ochoa, Grace Park, Stacy Prammanasudh, Sherri Steinhauer, and Karrie Webb.

Historical tour schedules and results

Awards
The Player of the Year Award is given to the player who leads the money list at the end of the season.
The Gaëlle Truet Rookie of the Year Award is awarded to the player competing in her first professional season who finishes highest on the Symetra Tour money List. Truet was a Tour member who was killed in a car accident during the 2006 season. The award was renamed in her honor beginning in 2006.
The Trainor Award has been given each year since 1999 to an individual or group that has made a significant contribution to women's golf. It is named in honor of the Tour's founder and former president, Eloise Trainor.
The Heather Wilbur Spirit Award has been given each year since 2003 to a Symetra Tour player who "best exemplifies dedication, courage, perseverance, love of the game and spirit toward achieving goals as a professional golfer." It is named in memory of Heather Wilbur, a four-year Futures Tour player who died from leukemia in 2000 at age 27.

The Big Break
Many of the contestants on The Golf Channel's The Big Break III: Ladies Only, which aired in the Spring of 2005, played on the Futures Tour, including Danielle Amiee, who ended up being the show's overall champion. The other players from the show that played on the Futures Tour were Jan Dowling, Valeria Ochoa, runner-up Pamela Crikelair, and LPGA veteran Cindy Miller. Show co-host Stephanie Sparks played on the Futures Tour from 1996 to 1999.

The Big Break V: Hawaii, which aired in the spring of 2006, included six additional Futures Tour competitors: Dana Lacey, Ashley Prange, Kim Lewellen, Kristina Tucker, Becky Lucidi and Jeanne Cho.  Prange won the competition; Cho was runner-up.

The Big Break VI: Trump National,  broadcast in the fall of 2006, included six more Futures Tour players: Rachel Bailey, the individual winner of the 2002 Sunbelt Conference Championship at New Mexico State University;  Bridget Dwyer, a member of the 2004 NCAA Women's Golf Championship winning team at UCLA; Ashley Gomes, the 2004 WAC Player of the Year and individual winner of the 2004 WAC Championship while at San Jose State University; Sarah Lynn Johnston, the 2004 Southern Conference Player of the Year and individual winner of the 2004 Southern Conference Championship while at Furman University; Kristy McPherson, a three-time NCAA All-American First Team selection and two-time individual winner of the SEC Championship while at The University of South Carolina; and Briana Vega, who holds North Carolina State University's scoring records for 18-holes (68) and 54-holes (216).

See also
Cactus Tour, lower-level women's tour in American Southwest

References

External links
 
 Life lessons of the Future Tour ESPN, July 14, 2006

 
Professional golf tours
Women's golf
Golf in the United States
Professional sports leagues in the United States
1981 establishments in the United States